Myrmecological News (previous name: Myrmecologische Nachrichten) is an independent, international, non-profit, peer-reviewed, open-access scientific journal devoted to all aspects of ant research. In a mix of research and review articles, all fields of myrmecology are covered.

It was relaunched in 2004.

Publisher 
The Austrian Society of Entomofaunistics (ÖGEF) is a scientific non-profit organisation promoting entomofaunistic research, with a geographic emphasis on Austria and the Palaearctic. Other publications: Beiträge zur Entomofaunistik.

Abstracting and indexing 
Myrmecological News is indexed and abstracted in the Web of Science (Impact Factor 2011: 2.644, Rank 5/85 in category Entomology),  The Zoological Record, Scopus, and Google Scholar.

References

External links 
 
 Austrian Society of Entomofaunistics Homepage

Entomology journals and magazines
Myrmecology
Irregular journals